A disposable or single-use camera is a simple box camera meant to be used once. Most use fixed-focus lenses. Some are equipped with an integrated flash unit, and there are even waterproof versions for underwater photography. Internally, the cameras use a 135 film or an APS cartridge.

While some disposables contain an actual cartridge as used for loading normal, reusable cameras, others just have the film wound internally on an open spool. The whole camera is handed in for processing. Some of the cameras are recycled, i.e. refilled with film and resold. The cameras are returned for "processing" in the same fashion as film cameras.

In general the one-time-use camera represents a return to the business model pioneered by Kodak for their KODAK camera, predecessor to the Brownie camera; it is particularly popular in situations where a reusable camera would be easily stolen or damaged, when one's regular camera is forgotten, or if one cannot afford a regular camera.

History

A company called Photo-Pac produced a cardboard camera beginning in 1949 which shot eight exposures and which was mailed-in for processing.  Cameras were expensive, and would often have been left safely at home when lovely scenes presented themselves.  Frustrated with missing photo opportunities, H. M. Stiles had invented a way to enclose 35mm film in an inexpensive enclosure without the expensive precision film transport mechanism.  It cost .  Though incredibly similar to  the familiar single-use cameras today, Photo-Pac failed to make a permanent impression on the market.

In 1966, a French company called FEX introduced a disposable bakelite camera called "Photo Pack Matic", featuring 12 photos (4×4 cm).

The currently familiar disposable camera was developed by Fujifilm in 1986. Their QuickSnap line, known as 写ルンです (Utsurun-Desu, "It takes pictures") in Japan, used 35 mm film, while Eastman Kodak's 1987 Fling was based on 110 film.  Kodak released a 35 mm version in 1988, and in 1989 renamed the 35 mm version the FunSaver and discontinued the 110 Fling.

Common uses 

Disposable cameras are popular with tourists and people traveling around the world to save pictures of their adventures.

Since the late 1990s, disposable cameras have become increasingly popular as wedding favors. Usually they are placed on tables at wedding receptions to be used by guests to capture their unique perspective of the event. More commonly they are available in colors to match the wedding theme such as ivory, blue, white, gold, etc.

So-called "accident camera kits" containing film-based disposable cameras are increasingly being carried in vehicles to take images as evidence after an accident. The absence of batteries allows instantaneous usage even after extended storage, for example in a glove compartment.

They often  have cheap plastic lenses, questionable film quality, fixed focal lengths but quick and 'point and shoot' ease make the disposable camera popular with many photographers who enjoy the 'less than perfect' style these cameras provide, in a move away from digital imagery, which can also be seen in the rise in popularity of 'lomography'. This has also led to a number of 'lost art' type projects where disposable cameras are left in public spaces with a message for anyone finding the camera to take some images and then post the camera back, or pass it on to another person. The low cost of the cameras makes them a perfect tool for these sorts of projects.

Digital 

Digital one-time-use cameras (and also digital one-time-use camcorders) are available in some markets; for example the US saw the introduction of one such digital camera in 2004. Digital disposables have not had the success of their film based counterparts, possibly from the expense of the process (especially compared to normal digital camera use) and the poor quality of the images compared to either a typical digital camera, or a disposable film camera. Usually, the display shows the number of shots remaining, and once this is completed, the camera is returned to the store. The digital files are then extracted from the camera, and in return for keeping the camera, they are printed out or stored to CD (or DVD in the case of the Video Camera ) for the customer. Almost all digital 'single use' cameras have been successfully hacked to eliminate the need to return them to the store. The motivations for such hacking include saving money and, more commonly, the challenge of overcoming artificial impositions (such as a 25 shot limit on an internal memory that can store 100 images).

Other uses 

The high-voltage photo flash capacitors in some cameras are sometimes extracted and used to power devices such as coil guns, stun guns,
homemade Geiger counter projects  and "RFID zapper" EMP devices.

See also 
 Planned obsolescence

References

External links
 Science Channel's The Making Series: #11 Recycling of Single-Use Cameras (video)
 The Kodak Fun Collection, single use cameras page by Remy Steller
 The  Collection, single use cameras page by Christophe DUCHESNE

Cameras by type
Electronic waste
Disposable products

fr:Appareil photographique compact#Appareil photographique prêt-à-photographier